Sports Media, Inc. (SMI) is a sports media and marketing company that produces radio and television programming as well as representing professional athletes.

Shows
Cowboys Live
2005 NFL Wrap-Up
Inside The Huddle
Martellus Bennett Show(2009)
Keith Brooking Show (2010)

Sports mass media in the United States
Sports management companies
Companies based in Dallas